Yaribeth Andreína Ulacio Villanueva (born 10 January 1993) is a Venezuelan footballer who plays as a defender for Austrian ÖFB-Frauenliga club FFC Vorderland and the Venezuela women's national team.

International career
Ulacio represented Venezuela at the 2010 FIFA U-17 Women's World Cup. She made her senior debut on 4 October 2019 in a 1–1 friendly draw against Paraguay.

References

External links

1993 births
Living people
Women's association football defenders
Venezuelan women's footballers
Venezuela women's international footballers
Venezuelan expatriate women's footballers
Venezuelan expatriate sportspeople in Austria
Expatriate women's footballers in Austria
ÖFB-Frauenliga players